The Global Oscillation Network Group (GONG) is a worldwide network of six identical telescopes, designed to have 24/7 observations of the Sun. The network serves multiple purposes, including the provision of operation data for use in space weather prediction, and the study of solar internal structure and dynamics using helioseismology.

Deployed in 1995, GONG is a set of six observing systems geographically distributed around the Earth so that the Sun can be observed as continuously as possible. The six observatories are the Teide Observatory (Canary Islands), the Learmonth Solar Observatory (Western Australia), the Big Bear Solar Observatory (California), the Mauna Loa Observatory (Hawaii), the Udaipur Solar Observatory (India) and the Cerro Tololo Inter-American Observatory (Chile). 
With these sites, GONG typically can observe the Sun 91% of the time, 24/7. GONG was constructed to provide observations for helioseismology, which aims to understand the solar interior by analyzing the sound waves that are trapped in it. In 2001, the original GONG detectors were upgraded to 1000 x 1000 pixels and continuous magnetograms were implemented, and the new system is known as GONG++. While GONG still provides helioseismology data, it now also provides full-disk solar magnetic field maps (magnetograms) every minute and full-disk images of the Sun in the wavelength of the Hydrogen–α (Hα) spectral line every 20 seconds. These data products are used for research into the solar magnetic field and chromosphere but are also essential inputs into forecasts of space weather. The NOAA Space Weather Prediction Center (SWPC), the US Airforce 557th Weather Wing, and the NASA Community Coordinated Modeling Center (CCMC) all use GONG data to predict space weather conditions.

The GONG Project is managed by the National Solar Observatory's Integrated Synoptic Program (NISP), which is operated by AURA, Inc. under a cooperative agreement with the National Science Foundation. GONG has been in operation since 1995 and is aging rapidly. To replace it, NSO is proposing to design and build a next-generation Ground-based solar Observing Network, provisionally named ngGONG.

GONG Gallery

External links 
GONG info at the National Solar Observatory site

Solar observatories